Colopterus truncatus is a species of sap-feeding beetle in the family Nitidulidae. It is found in the Caribbean Sea, Central America, North America, and South America.This particular sap beetle is thought to be one of the principal sap beetle vectors of oak wilt fungus in Minnesota.

References

Further reading

 

Nitidulidae
Articles created by Qbugbot
Beetles described in 1838